Johan Lindstedt (born 28 January 1972) is a retired Swedish ice hockey player. Lindstedt was part of the Djurgården Swedish champions' team of 1991. Lindstedt made 48 Elitserien appearances for Djurgården.

References

Swedish ice hockey players
Djurgårdens IF Hockey players
1972 births
Living people